Priscilla Hojiwala is an American broadcast journalist and sports anchor in Los Angeles last reported as working as an on-air correspondent for REELZCHANNEL freelance, covering Hollywood movie premieres, awards shows, red-carpet events, and press junkets.  She is a contributor to the 'Dailies' show, a daily news and information program focused on the movies, hosted by Mike Richards.

Early life
Hojiwala was 12 when she decided she wanted to be in television. Growing up in the Bay Area during the heyday of Giants and the 49ers, she became a huge sports fan and set her sights on becoming a television sports journalist.

College
To pursue her dream, Hojiwala came to Los Angeles to attend USC, majoring in broadcast journalism with a minor in Interdisciplinary Sports Studies. During her four years at the university, she interned for Fox Sports, SportsChannel in L.A., at KCBS, where she was a research assistant for broadcaster Roy Firestone, and at ESPN2, where she worked as a production assistant for Jim Rome and Chris Myers.

Broadcasting career
Upon graduating from USC, Hojiwala went to work for Fox Sports as a production assistant on their NFL and Major League Baseball pre-game shows. She was a reporter for Fox NFL Sunday. Then she was a weekend sports anchor at KESQ, the ABC affiliate in Palm Springs, California. During the week she worked for the Orange County News Channel covering the Anaheim Angels and the Mighty Ducks of Anaheim. Hojiwala moved on to become a full-time sports anchor for KESQ and later for Fox affiliate KDFX.

Looking for a new challenge, Hojiwala came to TVG  primarily as a reporter in July 1999. She hosted a show called 'Lady Luck". Eventually a full-time anchor on the network, she loved "the concept, ideas and challenge of being part of something revolutionary."While at TVG, she covered all 3 legs the Triple Crown and she also covered the Breeders Cup.

Hojiwala left TVG in February 2005 to work as host/anchor/reporter for Fox Sports Net West as anchor/reporter of the live, nightly sports highlight show, the Southern California Sports Report. In addition to her role as co-anchor, she reported on the Los Angeles Lakers, Los Angeles Clippers, Los Angeles Angels of Anaheim, Los Angeles Dodgers, Anaheim Ducks, Los Angeles Kings, UCLA Basketball, USC Football, NASCAR and Major League Soccer. She left FOX in February 2007 and returned to TVG in September 2005. She covered the 2006 Kentucky Derby for TVG and FOX Sports West as she was a contributor to The Works. She also hosted Lady Luck with Christina Olivares and Nancy Ury. She left TVG again in October 2006.
She has interviewed Oprah Winfrey, Kobe Bryant, Tiger Woods, Hugh Jackman, Matt Damon, Ben Affleck, Oscar Award-winning Director Danny Boyle, and President Gerald Ford.
Her involvement with various charities includes work with Second Harvest Food Bank, Childhelp USA, Olive Crest, and Women Helping Women.

As of October 2007, she is working as a freelance on-air correspondent for REELZCHANNEL and Pyramid Productions covering Hollywood movie premieres, awards shows, red-carpet events, and press junkets.  She is a contributor to the 'Dailies' show, a daily news and information program focused entirely on the movies, hosted by Mike Richards. REELZCHANNEL is a national television network dedicated entirely to movies and is currently in distribution in 30 million homes across the United States.

Notes 

American women journalists
Living people
Year of birth missing (living people)
USC Annenberg School for Communication and Journalism alumni
American sports announcers
American horse racing announcers
National Football League announcers
Women sports announcers
American infotainers
Place of birth missing (living people)
21st-century American women